Hesston is a city in Harvey County, Kansas, United States.  As of the 2020 census, the population of the city was 3,505.  Large manufacturing facilities for AGCO (farm equipment) and Excel Industries (lawn mowers) are located in Hesston.  It is home of Hesston College.

History

Early history

For many millennia, the Great Plains of North America was inhabited by nomadic Native Americans. From the 16th century to 18th century, the Kingdom of France claimed ownership of large parts of North America. In 1762, after the French and Indian War, France secretly ceded New France to Spain, per the Treaty of Fontainebleau.

19th century

In 1802, Spain returned most of the land to France. In 1803, most of the land for modern day Kansas was acquired by the United States from France as part of the 828,000 square mile Louisiana Purchase for 2.83 cents per acre.

In 1854, the Kansas Territory was organized, and in 1861, Kansas became the 34th U.S. state. In 1872, Harvey County was established within the Kansas Territory which included the land for modern day Hesston.

A post office was established as Elivon on February 10, 1873. It then moved near the current city site on April 24, 1878.

In 1886, Hesston was founded and named after the Hess brothers who owned the land where a depot on the Missouri Pacific Railroad was built. The post office was renamed to Hesston on December 16, 1887. Due to the railroad, Hesston became an important regional shipping point.

20th century
In 1909, the Mennonite Church founded the Hesston College, because many of the early settlers were Mennonite farmers.

In 1947, Lyle Yost and Adin Holdemann founded the farm equipment company Hesston Manufacturing Company. In 1991, AGCO Corporation purchased the company. In the 1960s, John Regier founded the lawn mower company Excel Industries.

In 1981, the Dyck Arboretum of the Plains was founded at the Hesston College.

On March 13, 1990, a large portion of Hesston was damaged by an F5 tornado during a tornado outbreak. A total of 226 homes and 21 businesses were destroyed, and several were swept completely from their foundations. 20 farms were torn apart in rural areas outside of Hesston. One person died and 59 people were injured. After passing through Hesston, the tornado increased to an "extreme F5" near the city of Goessel. The severity of the damage left behind by this tornado led some meteorologists to believe that the Goessel tornado was among the strongest ever documented at that time.

21st century
On February 25, 2016, Hesston became the scene of a mass shooting in which three people were killed and twelve others injured at an Excel Industries building. Prior to that shooting, other shooting incidents occurred at the nearby city of Newton and also Old U.S. Route 81, in which two people were wounded. The shooter was identified as Excel employee Cedric Larry Ford, who was killed by responding police officers.

Geography
Hesston is located at coordinates 38.1383437, -97.4314267 in the state of Kansas.

Climate

The climate in this area is characterized by hot, humid summers and generally mild to cool winters.  According to the Köppen Climate Classification system, Hesston has a humid subtropical climate, abbreviated "Cfa" on climate maps.

Demographics

2010 census
As of the census of 2010, there were 3,709 people, 1,345 households, and 972 families residing in the city. The racial makeup of the city was 92.7% White, 1.6% African American, 0.6% Native American, 1.7% Asian, 1.5% from other races, and 1.9% from two or more races. Hispanic or Latino of any race were 4.5% of the population.

There were 1,345 households, of which 32.7% had children under the age of 18 living with them, 62.4% were married couples living together, 7.4% had a female householder with no husband present, 2.5% had a male householder with no wife present, and 27.7% were non-families. 25.4% of all households were made up of individuals, and 13.3% had someone living alone who was 65 years of age or older. The average household size was 2.48 and the average family size was 2.96.

The median age in the city was 37.2 years. 24.3% of residents were under the age of 18; 12.7% were between the ages of 18 and 24; 20.8% were from 25 to 44; 22.6% were from 45 to 64; and 19.6% were 65 years of age or older. The gender makeup of the city was 49.0% male and 51.0% female.

2000 census
As of the census of 2000, there were 3,509 people, 1,227 households, and 904 families residing in the city. The racial makeup of the city was 94.56% White, 1.48% African American, 0.60% Native American, 0.83% Asian, 1.25% from other races, and 1.28% from two or more races. Hispanic or Latino of any race were 2.88% of the population.

There were 1,227 households, out of which 35.0% had children under the age of 18 living with them, 64.5% were married couples living together, 7.6% had a female householder with no husband present, and 26.3% were non-families. 23.7% of all households were made up of individuals, and 10.8% had someone living alone who was 65 years of age or older. The average household size was 2.52 and the average family size was 2.99.

In the city, the population was spread out, with 24.6% under the age of 18, 14.3% from 18 to 24, 23.5% from 25 to 44, 18.0% from 45 to 64, and 19.7% who were 65 years of age or older. The median age was 36 years. For every 100 females, there were 93.4 males. For every 100 females age 18 and over, there were 86.9 males.

As of 2000 the median income for a household in the city was $42,585, and the median income for a family was $51,474. Males had a median income of $39,891 versus $26,424 for females. The per capita income for the city was $18,138. About 3.9% of families and 5.5% of the population were below the poverty line, including 5.6% of those under age 18 and 4.9% of those age 65 or over.

Economy

The two largest companies in Hesston are AGCO (Hesston Corp) and Excel Industries (Hustler).

In 1947, Lyle Yost founded the farm equipment company Hesston Manufacturing Company.  In 1955, it introduced the first commercially available self-propelled windrower, then in 1967 it introduced the first hydrostatic drive windrower.  In 1978, it introduced the first large square baler, then in 1988 it introduced the first totally automatically large round baler.  In 1974, the Hesston Company commissioned its first belt buckles, which became popular on the rodeo circuit and with collectors.  The company's controlling stake was sold to Italian corporation Fiat Trattori in 1977. The remainder of the company was purchased in 1987 by the same firm.  In 1991, the American-based equipment manufacturer AGCO Corporation purchased Hesston Corporation and later expanded the manufacturing facilities.

In 1960, John Regier founded the lawn mower company Excel Industries.  The company manufactures Hustler and Big Dog mowing equipment.

Arts and culture
 Dyck Arboretum of the Plains, a botanical garden at Hesston College.

Government
The Hesston government consists of a mayor and five council members.  The council meets the 2nd Monday of each month at 6pm.
 City Hall, 115 E Smith.

Education

Primary and secondary education
The community is served by Hesston USD 460 public school district.  It has three schools:
 Hesston High School, 200 N. Ridge Road, Hesston.
 Hesston Middle School, 100 N. Ridge Road, Hesston.
 Hesston Elementary School, 300 E. Amos, Hesston.

College
 Hesston College, a two-year college.

Media

Print
Newspaper
 Hesston Record, local newspaper in Hesston.
 The Newton Kansan, regional newspaper in Newton.
 The Wichita Eagle, major regional newspaper in Wichita.

Radio
Hesston is served by numerous radio stations of the Wichita-Hutchinson listening market area, and satellite radio.  See Media in Wichita, Kansas.

Television
Hesston is served by over-the-air ATSC digital TV of the Wichita-Hutchinson viewing market area, cable TV by Allegiance Communications, and satellite TV.  See Media in Wichita, Kansas.

Infrastructure

Transportation
Interstate I-135 and highway US 81 pass through Hesston.

Hesston is serviced by a branch of the Kansas and Oklahoma Railroad operating between McPherson and Newton, where it connects to the BNSF Railway.

Utilities
 Internet
 Wired is provided by Cox Communications (cable), CenturyLink (DSL).
 Wireless is provided by Keyon Communications (wireless), Pixius Communications (wireless), AT&T Mobility / Sprint / Verizon (cellular).
 Satellite is provided by HughesNet, StarBand, Wildblue.
 TV
 Cable is provided by Cox Communications.
 Satellite is provided by DirecTV, Dish Network.
 Terrestrial is provided by regional digital TV stations.
 Telephone
 Landline is provided by CenturyLink.
 Cell Phone is provided by AT&T Mobility, Sprint, Verizon.
 Electricity
 City is provided by Westar Energy.
 Rural is provided by Westar Energy.
 Natural Gas
 Service is provided by City of Hesston.
 Water
 City is provided by City of Hesston.
 Rural is provided by Harvey County RWD #1 (map), Harvey County RWD #2, and Marion County RWD #4.
 Sewer
 Service is provided by City of Hesston.
 Trash
 Service is provided by Waste Connections, billed by City of Hesston.

Notable people

 Lyle Yost, Founder of Hesston Industries.
 Katie Sowers, Offensive assistant coach for the San Francisco 49ers, first openly LGBTQ coach in the National Football League, first female to coach in a Super Bowl, second full-time female coach in NFL history

References

Further reading

City
 Hesston, Kansas, 1886-1986; Murray Bandy; 1988.
 Anatomy of a Town: Hesston, Kansas; Mary Hess; 1976; .
College
 A School on the Prairie: A Centennial History of Hesston College, 1909-2009; John Sharp; 2009; .
 A Pillar of Cloud the Story of Hesston College; Mary Miller; 1959; ASIN B000JEMKR8.
Hesston Corp
 Factory on the Plains: Lyle Yost and the Hesston Corporation; Billy Mac Jones; Wichita State University; 1987; ASIN B0006EQOU0.

External links

City
 
 Hesston - Directory of Public Officials, League of Kansas Municipalities
Historical
 Harvey County Roots
 Harvey County Genealogical Society
 Clashing Symbols In A Quiet Town - Hesston In The Vietnam War Era, Autumn 2000, Kansas History
1990 Tornado
 Photos from 1990 tornado damage
 "Monster on the Prairie, Hesston, Kansas 1990"
 Video of the tornado
 "20 Years After the Tornado"
Maps
 Hesston City Map, KDOT
 Harvey County Maps: Current, Historic, KDOT

Cities in Kansas
Cities in Harvey County, Kansas
Wichita, KS Metropolitan Statistical Area